Sylvie Levecq is a former French athlete, born 5 December 1962 at Lille, who specialized in the pentathlon.

She was French Indoors Champion for the pentathlon in both 1984 and 1985.

She is the daughter of weightlifter Roger Levecq.

Notes and references

External links 
 Profil on athle.com
 

1962 births
Living people
French heptathletes
French pentathletes
French female athletes